Sergei Mikhailovich Lysenko (born 24 August 1972) is a former Russian football player.

References

1972 births
Living people
Soviet footballers
FC Kuban Krasnodar players
Russian footballers
Russian Premier League players
FC Vityaz Podolsk players
FC Spartak Semey players
Russian expatriate footballers
Expatriate footballers in Kazakhstan
FC Slavyansk Slavyansk-na-Kubani players
Association football defenders
FC Spartak Vladikavkaz players